Kazemabad (also Romanized as Kāz̧emābād) is a village in Zeydabad Rural District, in the Central District of Sirjan County, Kerman Province, Iran. At the 2006 census, its population was 412, in 104 families.

References 

Populated places in Sirjan County